Gundermann (Gerhard Gundermann, 1955–1998), was a German singer-songwriter and rock musician.

Gundermann may also refer to:
Gerhard Gundermann (1955–1998),  German singer-songwriter and rock musician
Gotthold Gundermann (1856–1921), German classical philologist
Karsten Gundermann (born 1966), German composer
Romy Gundermann (1933–2019), German soprano 
Gundermann (film), 2018 German film directed by Andreas Dresen

See also
Gudermann
Gunderman, New South Wales